Kathy (Wernly) Clark is an American bestselling author of contemporary romance novels that encompass the young adult mystery, new adult romantic suspense, erotic romance and contemporary romance genres.  She has also published works under the pen names of Kris Cassidy and Bob Kat (Co-written with her husband, Bob Wernly).

Biography
Kathy Clark was born in Houston, Texas, grew up in Alvin, Texas and graduated from Sam Rayburn High School in Pasadena, Texas.  She sold her first book to Dell for their Candlelight Ecstasy romance line in 1983.  In 1989 she sold Sweet Anticipation to Harlequin American which began a long association with Harlequin editor Tahti Carter.  Clark's 23 women's fiction (romance) novels have sold over 3 million copies in more than 10 languages and have been on the New York Times’ bestsellers’ list and won numerous awards.  

In 2015, she graduated summa cum laude from York College of Pennsylvania with a BA in Mass Communications and Fine Arts with a perfect 4.0 GPA.  She then worked as an adjunct professor at York College and taught an upper-level media writing class.

In 2012, she teamed up with her husband Bob Wernly to write a young adult time travel mystery/romance series called Time Shifters under the pen name of Bob Kat.

Beginning in 2013, Clark began co-writing all of her books with Wernly.  They have self-published three books in their new adult series Scandals under the name Kathy Clark.

In 2015, their Denver Heroes series was published by Random House, followed in 2016 with their Austin Heroes series.

Bibliography

Dell Candlelight Ecstasy Romances

 1985 Another Sunny Day 
 1985 A Private Affair 
 1985 Golden Days 
 1986 A Hint of Splendor (reissued as Starry Nights) 
 1986 Passion and Possession 
 1987 Destiny's Lady (reissued as Tempting Fate)
 1987 Carousel of Love (reissued as Risky Business)

Harlequin American Romances

 1988 Sweet Anticipation
 1989 Kissed by an Angel
 1990 Sight Unseen
 1990 Phantom Angel
 1990 Angel of Mercy
 1991 Starting Over
 1992 Good Morning, Miss Greene
 1992 Cody's Last Stand
 1992 Count Your Blessings
 1993 Goodbye Desperado
 1994 Groom Unknown (reissued as Cold Feet, Warm Heart)
 1995 Stroke of Midnight

Harlequin Superromance

 1993 Hearts Against the Wind (Crystal Creek Series)
 1993 Stand by Your Man (Crystal Creek Series)

Crown Pageant Romances

 1989 No Satisfaction (as Kris Cassidy)

Originally Kismet Romances
 1990 Born to be Wild

Audio Entertainment Romances

 1993 Whisper Sweet Nothings (with Margie Hansen)
 1993 A Man For Molly (with Margie Hansen)

As Kathy Clark

 2012 Life's What Happens
 2012 After Midnight Book No. 1 of Denver Heroes Romantic Suspense Series
 2013 Cries in the Night Book No. 2 of Denver Heroes Romantic Suspense Series
 2013 Due Dates Book No. 1 of the New Adult Romantic Suspense series, Scandals
 2014 Killer Date Book No. 2 of the New Adult Romantic Suspense series, Scandals
 2015 After Midnight Book No. 1 of Denver Heroes Romantic Suspense Series Published by Random House
 2015 Cries in the Night Book No. 2 of Denver Heroes Romantic Suspense Series Published by Random House
 2015 Worst Date Ever Book No. 3 of the New Adult Romantic Suspense series, Scandals
 2015 Deep Night Book No. 3 of Denver Heroes Romantic Suspense Series Published by Random House
 2015 Fantasy Suite Book No. 1 of Erotic Romance Room Service Series Published by Loose Id
 2016 After Love Book No. 1 of Austin Heroes Romantic Suspense Series Published by Random House
 2016 Master Suite Book No. 2 of Erotic Romance Room Service Series
 2016 Almost Forever Book No. 2 of Austin Heroes Romantic Suspense Series Published by Random House

Time Shifters Series 

 2012 Change The Past (as Bob Kat)
 2013 Day at the Beach (as Bob Kat) 
 2013 Runaway Lover (as Bob Kat) 
 2014 Forever Love Book No. 4 (as Bob Kat) 
 2016 Not My Life (as Bob Kat)

Awards

 1991 Romance Writers of America Emma Merritt Service Award
1991 Romantic Times Reviewer's Choice Award for Angel Of Mercy

 2014 Colorado Humanities Colorado Book Award Finalists for Cries in the Night

References

External links

1951 births
Living people
American romantic fiction novelists
American mystery novelists
American young adult novelists
York College of Pennsylvania alumni
American women novelists
Women writers of young adult literature
Women mystery writers
Women romantic fiction writers
People from Alvin, Texas
21st-century American women